Zuver may refer to:

Zuver, California
Merle Zuver (1905–1969), American football player